Gustavo Ramos Hernández (born 16 June 1974) is a Mexican equestrian. He competed in two events at the 2004 Summer Olympics.

References

1974 births
Living people
Mexican male equestrians
Olympic equestrians of Mexico
Equestrians at the 2004 Summer Olympics
Sportspeople from Mexico City